Union is a settlement in Lot 4 and Lot 5, Prince Edward Island.

Communities in Prince County, Prince Edward Island